Kokkedal Station is a railway station serving the suburb of Kokkedal on the east coast of North Zealand, north of central Copenhagen.

The station is located on the coast between Helsingør and Copenhagen. The train services are currently operated by the railway company DSB Øresund which runs a frequent Oresundtrain service between Helsingør and Copenhagen with some services continuing on to Malmö and other destinations in southern Sweden.

Bus Links 
There are currently five bus routes which operate out of the station (30/10/2017), of which two are S-buses, two are local services and one is an R-bus.

Services are as follows:
 150S to Nørreport St.
 500S to Ørestad St.
 353 to Helsingør St.
 383 to Mikkelborg Park
 383 to Rungsted Kyst St.
 365R to Fredensborg St.
At peak times, the S-bus routes operate with 6 buses-per-hour (bph), the local routeswith 2 bph and the R-bus with 2 bph.

See also
 List of railway stations in Denmark

External links

DSB Øresund's website

Railway stations in the Capital Region of Denmark
Buildings and structures in Hørsholm Municipality
Railway stations opened in 1906
Heinrich Wenck buildings
1906 establishments in Denmark
Railway stations in the Øresund Region
Railway stations in Denmark opened in the 20th century